= Mustafa Al Saifi =

Palestinian journalist and poet

- Born: 1938 (age 87–88)
- Education: Amman

Mustafa Khaleel Salem Al Saifi (Arabic: مصطفى الصيفي) is a Palestinian journalist and poet. He was born in 1938, in Al Walja’a district of Jerusalem, he's the older brother of the poet Maryam Al Saifi. He studied in Amman and worked as an editor in Jordan then worked in Kuwait in (Gulf Sound) (Sawt Al Khaleej) newspaper. He later moved to Bahrain and established New Society, a publication. He then set up a printing press in Jordan.

== Biography ==
Mustafa Khaleel Salem Al Saifi was born in the year (1357 AH- 1938 AD) in Al Walja’a district of Jerusalem. He immigrated to Jordan after Al Nakba, studied and finished his middle school in Amman. He worked in Jordan, then in (Gulf Sound) (Sawt Al Khaleej) newspaper and Kuwait radio in Kuwait, he then moved to Bahrain in which he created a weekly social magazine called (New Society) (Al Mojtama’a Al Jadeed), and was its editorial director between 1971 till 1973, then headed back to Jordan where he established and ran a printing press. He currently lives in Wroclaw, Poland.

== Published works ==
He has several published and unpublished poetry collections.

- Lights for Long Travels, a collection of poetry, 1978 (original title: Qanadeel lel Safar Altaweel)
- Loyalty and Redemption story, 1959 (original title: Wafa'a wa Fada'a )
